Dibenzylaniline or N,N-Dibenzylaniline is a chemical compound consisting of aniline with two benzyl groups as substituents on the nitrogen.

The substance crystallizes in the monoclinic crystal system. The space group is P21/n. The unit cell dimensions are a=11.751 Å b=9.060 Å c=29.522 Å, and β=94.589°. Each unit cell contains two molecules. In the solid van der Waals forces hold it together. The substance can also crystallize in alternate monoclinic form.

Production
One method to produce dibenzylaniline is using a mixture of dibutyl tin dichloride and dibutyl stannane with N-benzilideneaniline along with hexamethylphosphoric triamide dissolved in tetrahydrofuran which yields a tin amide compound. This then reacts with benzyl bromide to yield dibenzylaniline.

Another method uses aniline and benzyl bromide.

Use
It used to make dyes.

A nitroso derivative (made using nitrite and hydroxylamine) can be used in a colourimetric test for palladium.

References

Anilines